Pariab-e Seyd-e Mohammad (also Romanized as Pārīāb-e Şeyd-e Moḩammad) is a village in Keshvar Rural District, Papi District, Khorramabad County, Lorestan Province, Iran. At the 2006 census, its population was 20, in 4 families.

References 

Towns and villages in Khorramabad County